Gopal Balakrishnan was a professor in the History of Consciousness Department at the University of California, Santa Cruz, until he was fired due to allegations of sexual assault. 

Balakrishnan studied European intellectual history and historical sociology at UCLA during the 1990s with Perry Anderson, Robert Brenner, Rogers Brubaker, and Michael Mann. He worked on political thought, intellectual history, and critical theory. Prior to his appointment at UC-Santa Cruz, he was a postdoctoral fellow at the University of Chicago. 

In 2017, a number of people published allegations that Balakrishnan had committed sexual assault on multiple occasions. UC Santa Cruz launched an investigation in 2017 that was extended in May 2018. In October 2018, Balakrishnan remained on paid administrative leave. He subsequently resigned as a member of the editorial board of the New Left Review. In September 2019, he was fired from his position at UCSC, becoming the first tenured faculty member to be fired at UCSC.

Selected publications

Books

Articles
 
Review of the book Empire by Michael Hardt and Antonio Negri.
 
Review of the book The Shield of Achilles by Philip Bobbitt.
 
 
Review of the book Valences of the Dialectic by Frederic Jameson.

References

External links
 Review of The Enemy: An Intellectual Portrait of Carl Schmitt

Living people
University of California, Santa Cruz faculty
University of Chicago faculty
University of California, Los Angeles alumni
American Marxists
American political philosophers
Marxist theorists
1966 births
Carl Schmitt scholars